Peter Francis James (born September 16, 1956) is an American actor and voice-over artist, distinguished by his strong baritone.

Early life
James was born September 16, 1956, in Chicago, Illinois, to David James and Mary Galloway James. He has five siblings.

Career

Theater
James's acting career began in 1979, when he appeared in a version of Shakespeare's Coriolanus, starring Earle Hyman and Morgan Freeman.

He received his first Obie award for his portrayal of Claire in Jean Genet's The Maids. He received his second Obie award, a Drama Desk award, and the Lortel award for his portrayal of Colin Powell in Stuff Happens. He appeared as Oscar opposite Dame Maggie Smith in Edward Albee's The Lady from Dubuque at the Theatre Royal Haymarket, and reprised the role in New York, opposite Jane Alexander.

He was a featured player in Regina Taylor's play Drowning Crow, at the Manhattan Theatre Club.

James is a guest instructor at HB Studio.

Film and television
James played Raymond Parks, husband of Rosa Parks, in the television film The Rosa Parks Story in 2002. He had a recurring role as Judge Kevin Beck on Law & Order: Special Victims Unit; and for playing Jahfree Neema in the HBO television series Oz. James has appeared in television series such as Gossip Girl, Law & Order: Criminal Intent (as Mr. Richmond), Law & Order, and Third Watch. In 2003, he took on the role of Clayton Boudreau on the daytime soap opera Guiding Light, a role he played until early 2004. In 2006, he returned for a single episode. In 2009, James returned to Guiding Light on a recurring basis.

His film roles include Double Platinum, Long Day's Journey into Night (1982). In 1990, he was in a television film of Hamlet, directed by Kevin Kline. He portrayed Thurgood Marshall in American Experience episode of "Simple Justice" (1993), and he played Isaac Coles in the miniseries The Wedding (1998).

Voice roles
He played the voice of Dr. J.S. Steinman in the video game BioShock, a game by Ken Levine. He has played in many minor role in films, such as appearing in movies like Joe Gould's Secret (2000) and Montana (1998).

He was the reader for the Recorded Books edition of Richard Wright's Native Son. The following biographical material appears on the 2000 audiobook of Mr. James's recording of Walter Mosley's Walking the Dog.

Personal life
James teaches drama at Yale University.

He was married to Jillian Nelson from 1995 to 2003.

Filmography

Film

Television

Video Games

References

External links
 
 
 
 "Peter Francis James speaks truth to power as Colin Powell in Stuff Happens" at Time Out New York

1956 births
Living people
Male actors from Chicago
American male film actors
African-American male actors
American male television actors
20th-century American male actors
21st-century American male actors
American male Shakespearean actors
American male stage actors
Yale School of Drama faculty